The following is a chronological list of mayors of Berlin, the capital city and city-state of Germany. The mayors are the head of the city-state, part of the senate of Berlin.

List

Napoleonic Empire (1806–1809) 
In 1806 the French occupants gathered 2,000 wealthy Berliners in St. Peter's Church, Berlin, in order to elect the Grand conseil (grand council) of sixty members again electing the Comité administratif (administrative committee). This body of seven elected burghers was the provisional city government competent to carry out the orders of the occupation power, especially to raise the French war contributions by levying them mostly from the 2,000 eligible voters. The président of the committee was the Berlin-based Prussian publisher:

Lord Mayor of the Royal Capital Berlin (1809–1920) 
Political party:

Lord Mayor of (Greater) Berlin (1918–1935)

City President of Berlin (1935–1945) 
The Nazi government introduced a new unitary municipal ordinance for all German municipalities and cities accounting for the de facto abolition of municipal democracy and autonomy since the Nazi takeover in 1933. According to the new ordinance the administrative head of the city was now titled Stadtpräsident (City President). The Oberbürgermeister remained in a ceremonial role.
 
Political party:

Lord Mayor of Greater Berlin under Allied occupation (1945–1948) 
Following Berlin's provisional post-war constitution, enacted under quadripartite Allied rule, the head of city government was titled again Oberbürgermeister (generally "Lord Mayor").
 
Political party:

Lord Mayor of Berlin (1948–1990) 
Political party:

Governing Mayor of Berlin (1951–present) 

Political party:

Notes

References

 

History of Berlin
Government of Berlin
Mayors
Berlin